Pkah Thgall Meas (Khmer: ផ្កាថ្កុលមាស) (The Golden Ball of 1969) is a 1975 Cambodian drama film. It was a well-known film in Cambodia before the Khmer Rouge gained power.

Plot 
Twin brothers are born on the same day that a murder occurs. The twins separate from each other; one is adopted into a rich family while the other remains on the poor ground. Several years past when the poor twin begins to fall in love with a rich man's daughter named Pkah Tgall Meas. The couple faces many adversities from a cruel wealthy man. It is up to the rich twin to save the life of his poor twin brother and his love Pkah Thgall Meas.

References

1975 films
1975 drama films
Cambodian drama films
Khmer-language films